The Ra'îs of Manûrqa is a Muslim political title given to the two governors that from 1234 to 1287 ruled the island of Manûrqa (modern Menorca) as a vassal state of the Kingdom of Majorca. During this period, the island was allowed a great deal of autonomy and it had the protection of the Kingdom of Majorca in exchange of an annual tribute.

List of Ra'îs of Manûrqa
 Abû 'Uthmân Sa'îd ibn Hakam al Qurashi (1234–1282)
 Abû 'Umar ibn Sa'îd (1282–1287)

13th century in Al-Andalus
Oriental islands of Al-Andalus
History of Menorca